The Order of Precedence in Sri Lanka the protocol list at which Sri Lankan government officials are seated according to their rank. This is not the list of succession.

Current Order of Precedence 
 President of Sri Lanka
 Prime Minister of Sri Lanka 
 Speaker of the Parliament
 Chief Justice of Sri Lanka
 Leader of the Opposition
 Ministers of the Cabinet of Sri Lanka
 Field marshal
 Governor of the Central Bank of Sri Lanka
 Provincial Governors (within their respective provinces)
 Provincial Chief Ministers (within their respective provinces)
 State Ministers
 Deputy Speaker of Parliament
 Deputy Ministers
 Deputy Chairman of Committees
 Chief Government Whip
 Ambassadors and High Commissioners (according to date of presentation of Letters of Credence or of assumption of duty) and Foreign Ministers and Envoys. 
 Members of the Constitutional Council
 Attorney General of Sri Lanka
 Supreme Court Judges
 President of the Court of Appeal
 Judges of the Court of Appeal
 Members of the Parliament. There is no established order of precedence over members of parliament in general, although each party has its internal ranking.
 Provincial Council Chairmen, Provincial Ministers and Leaders of the Opposition of Provincial Councils (in their respective provinces)
 Members of Provincial Councils
 Secretary to the President 
 Secretary to the Prime Minister
 Secretary to the Cabinet of Ministers
 Auditor General of Sri Lanka
 Secretaries of Cabinet Ministries/Senior Additional Secretaries to the President
           Secretary General of Parliament
           Chief of Staff of the Presidential Secretariat
           Chairmen of the Commissions
           Parliamentary Commissioner for Administration
           Chief Secretaries
           Presidential Adviser
           Deputy Secretary to the Treasury
           Secretary General of the Constitutional Council
           Chairmen of the University Grants Commission
           Vice Chancellor appointed under the University Act
           Secretaries of State Ministries
           Additional Secretaries to the President
 Chief of the Defence Staff
 Heads of the Armed Forces, the Police and the Solicitor General
 The Commander of the Army  
 The Commander of the Navy  
 The Commander of the Air Force  
 The Inspector General of the Police  
           Solicitor General
           High Court Judges 
 Visiting Sri Lankan High Commissioners, Ambassador and Charges de Affaires
 Additional Secretaries to the Prime Minister 
 Additional Secretaries to the Ministries
 Directors General
 Commissioners General
 Controllers General
 Heads of Departments

Former Precedence Table for Ceylon 

 The Governor-General of Ceylon or Officer Administering the Government
 The Prime Minister of Ceylon 
 The Chief Justice of Ceylon
 The President of the Senate
 The Speaker of the House of Representatives
 Ministers of Cabinet rank (in the order of their appointment) 
 Ambassadors and High Commissioners (according to date of presentation of Letters of Credence or of assumption of duty) and Foreign Ministers and Envoys. 
 Ministers not of Cabinet rank
 Attorney General
 Puisne Judges
 The Deputy President of the Senate, the Deputy Speaker; Parliamentary Secretaries,  Deputy Chairman of Committees 
 Members of the Senate in their order
 Members of the House of Representatives in their order
 The Chairman, Public Service Commission
 Members of the Public Service Commission and the Judicial Service Commission
 The Secretary of the Treasury
 The Permanent Secretaries; The Deputy Secretary of the Treasury (in the order of their seniority) 
 Auditor General
 Commanding officers of Regular Ceylon Forces (if of the rank of Major General or equivalent)
 Members of Class I Grade I of the Ceylon Civil Service and Members of the Special Class of the Judicial Service
 Solicitor General
 Members of Class I Grade II of the Ceylon Civil Service; Heads of large Departments; Members of Class I Grade I of the Judicial Service; The Secretary to the Governor-General; The Secretary to the Prime Minister.
 The Clerk to the Senate
 The Clerk to the House of Representatives

References

External links
 Official website
Order of precedence
Orders of precedence
Order of precedence